Rifts: Promise of Power is a 2005 video game licensed for the Rifts role-playing game (RPG) from Palladium Books. It was later released in October for the N-Gage.

The basic mechanics of the game are adapted from the pen-and-paper version, utilizing an action point turn-based system.

Gameplay
There are three character classes available in Promise of Power. There are three proto-classes from which players can select at the outset of the game: Mercenary, Psionic, and Magic User. Upon reaching fourth level, players may choose a specialization such as Borg, Burster, or Ley Line Walker, some of which are restricted based on proto-class. One character class specially designed for the game – the Elemental Fusionist – was adapted into the Rifts Ultimate Edition core rulebook.

The game covers five different locations on Rifts Earth from the sourcebooks. Promise of Power is set on Rifts Earth, a post-apocalyptic world a few hundred years in the future. It features advanced technology, magic and psionic powers, alien and monstrous beings from other dimensions, mutants, and vampires.

Reception

The game received "generally favorable reviews" according to the review aggregation website Metacritic.

References

External links
 
 Rifts: Promise of Power official website 

2005 video games
Megaverse (Palladium Books)
N-Gage games
Rifts (role-playing game)
Role-playing video games
Science fantasy video games
Tactical role-playing video games
Video games based on tabletop role-playing games
Video games developed in the United States
Video games about parallel universes
Nokia games
Multiplayer and single-player video games